El Buen Pastor Airstrip is a public dirt airstrip located in San Quintín, Municipality of Ensenada, Baja California, Mexico, near the Federal Highway 1. The airstrip is part of a medical clinic operated by the Mexican Medical Ministries, an interdenominational non-profit organization dedicated to providing low cost health care. The airstrip is used solely for general aviation  purposes. The EBP code is used as identifier.

This air strip is no longer in service.

External links
Baja Bush Pilots forum about El Buen Pastor Airstrip.
The Flying Samaritans
Mexican Medical Ministries

Airports in Baja California